The 49th government of Turkey (20 November 1991 – 25 June 1993) was a coalition government formed by True Path Party (DYP) and Social Democratic Populist Party (SHP).

Election
The governing party in Turkey between 1983 and 1991 was Motherland Party (ANAP), but in the elections held on 20 November 1991, no party could win the majority. While ANAP gained 115 seats, DYP gained 178 and SHP gained 88 seats out of 450. DYP and SHP formed the coalition government. Süleyman Demirel (leader of DYP) was the prime minister, and Erdal İnönü (leader of SHP) was the deputy (later acting) prime minister.

The government
There were 14 state ministers, and one was changed during the lifespan of the cabinet. In the list below, the serving period of cabinet members who served only a part of the cabinet's lifespan are shown in the column "Notes".

Aftermath
On 16 May 1993, Süleyman Demirel was elected as the president of Turkey. According to the constitution, he left both the office and his post in the party. On 13 June 1993, DYP elected Tansu Çiller as its new leader, and thus, on 25 June, Tansu Çiller was appointed as the first female prime minister of Turkey and of the 50th government. Between 16 May and 25 June, Erdal İnönü was the acting prime minister.

References

Democrat Party (Turkey, current) politicians
Social Democratic Populist Party (Turkey) politicians
Cabinets of Turkey
1991 establishments in Turkey
1993 disestablishments in Turkey
Cabinets established in 1991
Cabinets disestablished in 1993
Coalition governments of Turkey
Members of the 49th government of Turkey
Democrat Party (Turkey, current)